The 1972 Copa Libertadores de América Finals was the final two-legged tie to determine the champion of the 1972 edition of Copa Libertadores. It was contested by Argentine club Independiente and Peruvian club Universitario. The first leg of the tie was played on May 17 at Estadio Nacional in Lima with the second leg played on May 24 at Estadio de Independiente in Avellaneda.

Independiente won 2-1 on aggregate, achieving its third Copa Libertadores title.

Qualified teams

Venues

Match details

First leg

Second leg

References

1
Copa Libertadores Finals
Copa Libertadores Final 1973
Copa Libertadores Final 1973
1972 in Peruvian football
Copa
Football in Avellaneda